Caitlin Upton or Caite Upton (born Lauren Caitlin Upton on born March 27, 1989 in Lexington, South Carolina) is an American fashion model and beauty pageant titleholder who was crowned Miss South Carolina Teen USA 2007 and represented South Carolina at Miss Teen USA 2007 where she placed 3rd Runner-Up.

Career

2007 Miss Teen USA pageant

Upton became Miss South Carolina Teen USA for 2007 in the November 2006 state pageant. She went on to place as third runner-up in the Miss Teen USA 2007 pageant. She gained international notoriety for her convoluted and nonsensical response to a question posed to her during the August 2007 national pageant. During the pageant, Upton responded to a question posed by host Aimee Teegarden: "Recent polls have shown a fifth of Americans can't locate the U.S. on a world map. Why do you think this is?" Upton responded:
I personally believe that U.S. Americans are unable to do so because, uh, some, uh, people out there in our nation don't have maps and, uh, I believe that our education like such as in South Africa and, uh, the Iraq, everywhere like such as, and, I believe that they should, our education over here in the U.S. should help the U.S., uh, or, uh, should help South Africa and should help the Iraq and the Asian countries, so we will be able to build up our future. For our children.

As a guest on NBC's The Today Show, Upton told Ann Curry and Matt Lauer that she was overwhelmed when asked the question and did not comprehend it correctly. The Today Show hosts gave Upton another opportunity to answer. She responded:

Well personally, my friends and I, we know exactly where the United States is on our map. I don't know anyone else who doesn't. And if the statistics are correct, I believe that there should be more emphasis on geography in our education so people will learn how to read maps better.
Both Curry and Lauer, along with unseen crew members, applauded her response.

Post pageant career
Since then, she has modeled in advertisements for companies such as Nautica and Wrangler and has appeared in national magazines such as Seventeen, Cosmo Girl and American Cheerleader. Upton later signed a deal with Donald Trump's modeling agency in New York City.

Upton appeared in Weezer's music video "Pork and Beans", which was released on May 23, 2008, where the microphone she held became a lightsaber. In the same video, she blends "Maps" in a Blendtec blender.

In 2010, Upton was a contestant on The Amazing Race 16, where she is credited as Caite Upton and finished the race in third place with her then-boyfriend Brent Horne.

Most recently Upton reported herself as selling real estate in Brentwood, Los Angeles. She married personal trainer Charlie McNeil in 2016 and they divorced in 2019. In December 2019, Upton announced that she was expecting her first child with her new boyfriend. They welcomed a son in January 2020.

References

External links

 
 The Amazing Race profile page

1989 births
Living people
21st-century American women
American female models
Female models from South Carolina
Internet memes
Place of birth missing (living people)
2007 beauty pageant contestants
21st-century Miss Teen USA delegates
People from Lexington, South Carolina
The Amazing Race (American TV series) contestants
Viral videos